Little Indian may refer to:

 Little Indian, Illinois, an unincorporated community in the US
 Little Indian River (Michigan), US

See also
 Little-endian, in computing 
 Ten Little Indians (disambiguation)